Feng Yan may refer to:

 Yan Feng (athlete), Chinese Paralympic athlete
 Feng Yan (director), Chinese documentary film maker
 Yan Feng (born 1982), Chinese footballer

See also
Fengyan (disambiguation)